Niyuguna Raja Maha Vihara is an ancient Buddhist temple in Niyuguna, Sri Lanka. Presently, the temple has been formally recognised by the Government as an archaeological site in Sri Lanka through a Gazette notification published on 26 December 2014.

The temple complex has been constructed on a rocky outcrop called Niyuguna Kanda. A large number of ancient monuments such as mounds of Stupas, rock inscriptions, ruined building structures, flight of steps, drip ledged caves, and Siripathul gal have been identified in the temple premises. The Brahmi inscriptions discovered from the site indicate that the temple has a history running back to the pre-Christian era.

References

External links

 

Buddhist temples in Ampara District
Archaeological protected monuments in Ampara District